This is an incomplete list of Japanese celebrities (geinōjin, 芸能人).

Comedians
Akashiya Sanma
Arino Shinya
Tamori
Kitano Takeshi
Hamada Masatoshi
Hamaguchi Masaru
Matsumoto Hitoshi
Hiroshi
Hisamoto Masami
Sakai Masaaki
Sumitani Masaki

See also List of Japanese comedians

Idols (male)
Arino Shinya
Daiki Arioka
Goro Inagaki
Hamaguchi Masaru
Hamada Asahi
Hikaru Yaotome
Hiroki Uchi
Jin Akanishi

Jun Matsumoto
Junnosuke Taguchi
Junichi Okada
Kanata Hongo
Kanemoto Yoshi
Katori Shingo
Yu Shirota
Kazunari Ninomiya
Kazuya Kamenashi
Kei Inoo
Keiichiro Koyama
Keita Tachibana
Keito Okamoto
Kimura Takuya
Koichi Domoto
Koike Teppei
Kota Yabu
Kusano Hironori
Masahiro Nakai
Masaki Aiba
Nakajima Kento
Nakamoto YYuta
Nishimura riki
Shingo Murakami
Ryo Nishikido
Ryohei Chiba
Ryuhei Maruyama
Ryuichi Ogata
Ryosuke Yamada
Satoshi Ohno
Shigeaki Kato
Shingo Murakami
Sho Sakurai
Shota Yasuda
Subaru Shibutani
Takahisa Masuda
Takata Mashiho
Tanaka Koki
Tatsuya Ueda
Tsuyoshi Domoto
Tsuyoshi Kusanagi
Tomohisa Yamashita
Toma Ikuta
Yu Yokoyama
Yuichi Nakamaru
Yuma Nakayama
Yuri Chinen
Yuto Nakajima
Yuya Takaki
Yuya Tegoshi
Rui Hachimura
Watanabe Haruto
Yuta Nakamoto

Idols (female)
Kanako Momota
Sora Tokui
Shiori Tamai
Ayaka Sasaki
Momoka Ariyasu
Reni Takagi
Akiyama Rina
Aya Ueto
Koike Eiko
Nakagawa Shoko
Natsukaw Jun
Uehara Takako
Yamamoto Azusa
Maeda Atsuko
Oshima Yuko
Itano Tomomi
Chise Nakamura
Haruna Iikubo 
Haruka Kudo
Ayumi Ishida
Masaki Sato
Mizuki Fukumura
Erina Ikuta 
Riho Sayashi
Kanon Suzuki
Umika Kawashima
Sayumi Michishige 
Kusumi Koharu
Erina Mano
Aya Matsuura
Yuki Kashiwagi
Mayu Watanabe
Jurina Matsui
Rena Matsui
Minami Takahashi
Suzuko Mimori
Minami Minegishi
Haruna Kojima
Aki Takajo
Emi Takei
Mariko Shinoda
Akimoto Sayaka
Tomomi Kasai
Rie Kitahara
Rino Sashihara
Yajima Maimi
Sae Miyazawa
Wakana Yamashita
Naomi Osaka

Models
Aki Hoshino
Ayumi Kinoshita
Riyo Mori
Ebihara Yuri
Fujiwara Norika
Inoue Waka
Mariya Nishiuchi
May J.
Meisa Kuroki
Oshikiri Moe
Rola
Umemiya Anna
Yamada Yu
Kanata Hongo
Emi Takei
Koharu Kusumi
Tao Okamoto
Suzuka Morita
Yuka Hirata
Honoka Miki

Musicians / Singers (male)
Gackt
hide
Hiromi Go
Hyde
Miyavi
Nobuyoshi Kuwano
Saijo Hideki
Takuya Ide
Masato Hayakawa
Yoshiki
Yousuke Itou
Yuya Miyashita

Musicians / Singers (female)
 Ai Otsuka
 Ai Takahashi
 Aiko Kayo
 Akiko Wada
 Alisa Durbrow
 Angela Aki
 Anna Tsuchiya
 Airi Suzuki
 Aya Hirano
 Aya Matsuura
 Aya Ueto
 Ayaka Hirahara
 Ayaka Komatsu
 Ayaka
 Ayumi Hamasaki
 Beni Arashiro
 Bonnie Pink
 Chiaki Kuriyama
 Chihiro Onitsuka
 Chisaki Hama
 Chitose Hajime
 Crystal Kay
 Erika Sawajiri
 Emi Hinouchi
 Emi Maria
 Emyli
 Garnet Crow
 Goto Maki
 Hagiwara Mai
 Halna
 Hikaru Nishida
 Hiro
 Hiroko Anzai
 Hiroko Shimabukuro
 hitomi
 Ikue Sakakibara
 Imai Eriko
 JASMINE
 Jun Natsukawa
 Junko Sakurada
 JYONGRI
 Kiyoe Yoshioka
 Kanako Enomoto
 Kanbe Miyuki
 Kanon Wakeshima
 Kawabe Chieco
 Kawase Tomoko
 Keiko Kitagawa 
 Kumi Koda
 Kusumi Koharu
 Kyary Pamyu Pamyu
 Lia
 Lisa Yamaguchi
 Maaya Sakamoto
 Maeda Atsuko
 Mai Hagiwara
 May J.
 Mari Amachi 
 Mariya Takeuchi
 Masako Mori
 Mei Yamazaki
 Meisa Kuroki
 Megumi Odaka
 Megumi
 Megumi Hayashibara
 Melody.
 Mew Azama
 MiCHi
 Mihiro Taniguchi
 Miho Komatsu
 Miho Nakayama
 Miho Yoshioka
 Miki Fujimoto
 Miliyah Kato
 MINMI
 Minori Chihara
 Miyu Sawai
 Mizuki Nana
 Momoe Yamaguchi
 Momoiro Clover Z
 Myco
 Mika Nakashima
 Namie Amuro
 Natsuyaki Miyabi
 Noriko Sakai
 Reina Tanaka
 Reon Kadena
 Ribbon
 Ryōko Hirosue
 Saori Minami
 Sayaka
 Sayumi Michishige
 Seiko Matsuda
 Shoko Nakagawa
 Takako Ohta
 Takako Uehara
 Thelma Aoyama
 Tomomi Itano
 Tsugunaga Momoko
 Hikaru Utada
 Waka Inoue 
 Yajima Maimi
 Yui
 Yui Makino
 Yukiko Okada
 Yuko Ogura
 Yuna Ito

Tarento
Elina Arai
Aya Ueto
Becky
Rola
Sakura Miyajima
Kazushige Nagashima
Kano sisters
Mina Fukui

Actors
Eita
Kamakari Kenta
Fujiwara Tatsuya
Ikuta Toma
Matsudaira Ken
Oguri Shun
Ryuhei Matsuda
Sato Takeru
Satoshi Tsumabuki
Shota Matsuda
Watanabe Ken
Manpei Takagi
Shinpei Takagi

See also List of Japanese actors

Actresses
Ai Takahashi
Koharu Kusumi
Aya Ueto
Ito Misaki
Honoka Miki
Karina
Koyuki
Maki Horikita
Mao Inoue
Meisa Kuroki
Mika Nakashima
Nao Nagasawa
Satomi Ishihara
Yonekura Ryoko
Yui Aragaki
Yukie Nakama
Kiko Mizuhara
See also List of Japanese actresses

TV / Radio Personalities
Airi Suzuki
Iijima Ai
Kano sisters
Mino Monta
Shinohara Tomoe
Sugita Kaoru
Mao Inoue

Others
Kurihara Harumi
Papaya Suzuki

See also
List of Japanese actors
List of Japanese actresses
List of Japanese comedians
Tarento
:Category:Japanese models

Japanese
Celebrities